Carmelina  is a musical with a book by Joseph Stein and Alan Jay Lerner, lyrics by Lerner, and music by Burton Lane.

Based on the 1968 film Buona Sera, Mrs. Campbell, it focuses on an Italian woman who has raised her teenaged daughter Gia to believe her father was an American who died heroically in World War II. Supposedly she spurns the constant advances of local café owner Vittorio because her heart still belongs to the man she tragically lost. In reality, she had affairs with three different GIs and has no idea who fathered the girl. Trouble ensues when the three veterans decide to reunite in Carmelina's small hometown.

After eleven previews, the Broadway production, directed by José Ferrer and choreographed by Peter Gennaro, opened on April 8, 1979 at the St. James Theatre, where it ran for only seventeen performances. The cast included Georgia Brown, Cesare Siepi, Grace Keagy, John Michael King, and Josie de Guzman.

A nomination for Best Original Score was its sole recognition from the Tony Awards committee.

A cast recording was released in 1980 on the Original Cast label, which specialises in preserving musicals that might not otherwise be recorded.  Co-produced by Bruce and Doris Yeko, the LP was made with the participation of original Broadway cast members Georgia Brown, Josie de Guzman, Grace Keagy, Gordon Ramsey and Howard Ross.  Leading man Cesare Siepi declined to participate in the project, so his role on the recording was filled by Paul Sorvino.

The York Theatre mounted a production of Carmelina in 2019 for its Musicals in Mufti series.

Song list
Act I
It's Time for a Love Song
Why Him?
I Must Have Her
Someone in April
Signora Campbell
Love Before Breakfast
Yankee Doodles Are Coming to Town
One More Walk Around the Garden
All That He'd Want Me To Be
It's Time for a Love Song (Reprise)

Act II
Carmelina
The Image of Me
I'm a Woman
The Image of You
It's Time for a Love Song (Reprise)

References

External links

1979 musicals
Broadway musicals
Musicals by Alan Jay Lerner
Musicals by Joseph Stein
Musicals based on films